Assis is a city and a municipality in São Paulo, Brazil.

Assis may also refer to:

People
Assis (footballer, born 1943), Brazilian footballer Francisco de Assis Luz Silva
Assis (footballer, born 1952), Brazilian footballer Benedito de Assis da Silva
Assis (footballer, born 1971), Brazilian footballer Roberto de Assis Moreira
Cláudio Assis, Brazilian filmmaker
Diego Assis (disambiguation), Brazilian football players
Éder Aleixo de Assis, a former Brazilian footballer
Francisco Assis, a Portuguese politician
Fúlvio de Assis, Brazilian professional basketball player
João Assis (born 1983), Brazilian jiu-jitsu practitioner
Machado de Assis, a Brazilian writer
Maicon Assis, Brazilian footballer
Nuno Assis, a Portuguese footballer
Raymundo Damasceno Assis, Brazilian Roman Catholic cardinal, former Archbishop of Aparecida (2004-2016)
Zezé Assis (1962–2007), Angolan basketball player

Other uses
Assisi, Italy, the birthplace of Saint Francis of Assisi
Prêmio Machado de Assis, a Brazilian literary prize

See also
 
 Assisi (disambiguation)